Banksia serratuloides is a species of small shrub that is endemic to Western Australia. It has linear, pinnatipartite leaves, yellow and pink flowers in heads of about forty and hairy, wrinkled follicles.

Description
There are between six and fifteen or between twenty and thirty-three (depending on subspecies) triangular to lance-shaped lobes on each side of the leaves.

Taxonomy and naming
This species was first formally described in 1855 by Carl Meissner who gave it the name Dryandra serratuloides and published the description in Hooker's Journal of Botany and Kew Garden Miscellany from specimens collected by James Drummond. The specific epithet (serratuloides) refers to the similarity of this species to species in the genus Serratula.

In 1996, Alex George described two subspecies in the journal Nuytsia:

In 2007 Austin Mast and Kevin Thiele transferred all dryandras to the genus Banksia and renamed the species Banksia serratuloides and the subspecies perissa and serratuloides respectively. The names B. serratuloides subsp. perissa and B. serratuloides subsp. serratuloides are accepted by the Australian Plant Census.

Distribution and habit
Banksia serratuloides grows in kwongan or open shrubland and occurs in two disjunct areas between Eneabba and Mogumber. Subspecies perissa is found between Alexander Morrison National Park, Badgingarra and Boothendarra Hill. Subspecies serratuloides occurs near Gillingarra and Mogumber.

Conservation status
Banksia serratuloides is classified as "not threatened" by the Western Australian Government Department of Parks and Wildlife, but both subspecies are listed as "Threatened Flora (Declared Rare Flora — Extant)" by the Department of Environment and Conservation (Western Australia).

References

 

serratuloides
Taxa named by Carl Meissner
Plants described in 1855